Jorge Andrés Sclarandi (born January 13, 1967) is an Argentina professional boxer.

On November 6, 1999 Jorge Sclarandi faced Juan Italo Meza for the South American middleweight title, which he won on points.

On October 20, 2001 in Kelvin Hall, Glasgow, Scotland. Jorge took on Robin Reid for the WBF Super Middleweight title. Reid struggled to KO Jorge and although the fight was all one way traffic, Reid resorted to head butting and elbowing, to try to knock out Jorge, who refused to give up and took Reid's best shots and stayed mainly on the ropes taking punches. Referee Marcus McDonnell stopped the fight due to the blood coming from the nose of Jorge Sclarandi which was caused by Reid head butting Jorge Sclarandi.

Professional boxing record 

|-
|align="center" colspan=8|28 Wins (2 KOs), 21 Losses, 1 Draw
|-
| align="center" style="border-style: none none solid solid; background: #e3e3e3"|Res.
| align="center" style="border-style: none none solid solid; background: #e3e3e3"|Record
| align="center" style="border-style: none none solid solid; background: #e3e3e3"|Opponent
| align="center" style="border-style: none none solid solid; background: #e3e3e3"|Type
| align="center" style="border-style: none none solid solid; background: #e3e3e3"|Round,Time
| align="center" style="border-style: none none solid solid; background: #e3e3e3"|Date
| align="center" style="border-style: none none solid solid; background: #e3e3e3"|Location
| align="center" style="border-style: none none solid solid; background: #e3e3e3"|Notes
|-align=center
|Loss
|28-21-1
|align=left| Mariano Natalio Carrera
|
|
|
|align=left|
|
|-align=center
|Loss
|28-20-1
|align=left| Sam Soliman
|
|
|
|align=left|
|
|-align=center
|Loss
|28-19-1
|align=left| Marcos Silvano Diaz
|
|
|
|align=left|
||

|-align=center
|Win
|28-18-1
|align=left| Marcos Silvano Diaz
|
|
|
|align=left|
|align=left|

|-align=center
|Loss
|27-18-1
|align=left| Danny Green
|
|
|
|align=left|
|
|-align=center
|Win
|27-17-1
|align=left| Julio César Vásquez
|
|
|
|align=left|
|align=left|

|-align=center
|Loss
|26-17-1
|align=left| Robin Reid
|
|
|
|align=left|
|align=left|

|-align=center
|Loss
|26-16-1
|align=left| Julio César Vásquez
|
|
|
|align=left|
|align=left|

|-align=center
|Win
|26-15-1
|align=left| Alessandro Filippo
|
|
|
|align=left|
|align=left|

|-align=center
|Win
|25-15-1
|align=left| Juan Italo Meza
|
|
|
|align=left|
|align=left|

|-align=center
|Win
|24-15-1
|align=left| Ariel Patricio Arrieta
|
|
|
|align=left|
|align=left|

|-align=center
|Win
|23-15-1
|align=left| Jose Luis Loyola
|
|
|
|align=left|
|align=left|

|-align=center
|Loss
|22-15-1
|align=left| Hacine Cherifi
|
|
|
|align=left|
|align=left|

|-align=center
|Loss
|22-14-1
|align=left| Mario Veit
|
|
|
|align=left|
|align=left|

|-align=center
|Win
|22-13-1
|align=left| Ramon Arturo Britez
|
|
|
|align=left|
|align=left|

|-align=center
|Loss
|21-13-1
|align=left| Hugo Ruben Gonzalez
|
|
|
|align=left|
|align=left|

|-align=center
|Loss
|21-12-1
|align=left| Peter Venancio
|
|
|
|align=left|
|align=left|

|-align=center
|Loss
|21-11-1
|align=left| Giovanni Pretorius
|
|
|
|align=left|
|align=left|

|-align=center
|Loss
|21-10-1
|align=left| Morrade Hakkar
|
|
|
|align=left|
|align=left|

|-align=center
|Win
|21-9-1
|align=left| Dario Victor Galindez
|
|
|
|align=left|
|align=left|

References

External links

1967 births
Living people
People from Lomas de Zamora
Argentine male boxers
Super-middleweight boxers
Sportspeople from Buenos Aires Province